Brand New Day is the ninth studio album from The Mavericks. It was released on March 31, 2017. It is the band's first studio album on their new Mono Mundo Recordings label.

Commercial performance
The album debuted at No. 149 on the Billboard 200, and No. 31 on Top Country Albums in its first week of release. It sold 5,000 copies in the first week, and a further 1,500 in the second week. The album has sold 15,800 copies in the US as of October 2017.

Track listing

Personnel
 Max Abrams - saxophone, clarinet
 Roy Agee - trombone
 Paul Deakin - glockenspiel, drums, timpani, marimba, vibraphone, chimes
 Julio Diaz - trumpet, percussion
 Ed Friedland - electric bass, upright bass
 Michael Guerra - percussion, acoustic guitar, accordion 
 Raul Malo - lead vocals, piano, percussion, electric guitar, acoustic guitar 
 Jerry Dale McFadden - piano, organ
 Eddie Perez - electric guitar,  acoustic guitar 
 Aaron Till - fiddle
 Scott Vestal - banjo
 Jay Weaver - double bass
Backing vocals
 Etta Britt
 Tiffany Johnson
 Ann McCrary
 Alfreda McCrary
 Regina McCrary
Technical
Kevin Dresser - sleeve design
Allen Harrill - photography

Charts

References

2017 albums
Albums produced by Niko Bolas
The Mavericks albums